The Territorial Prelature of Juli is a Roman Catholic territorial prelature in the city of Juli in the Ecclesiastical province of Arequipa in Peru.

History
On 3 August 1957, the Territorial Prelature of Juli was established from the Diocese of Puno.
On 3 April 2019 from its and the Roman Catholic Territorial Prelature of Ayaviri was established the Roman Catholic Territorial Prelature of Santiago Apóstol de Huancané

Ordinaries
 Prelates of Juli (Roman rite)
Edward L. Fedders, M.M. (3 August 1957 – 11 March 1973)
Albert I. Koenigsknecht, M.M. (11 February 1974 – 9 February 1986)
Raimundo Revoredo Ruiz, C.M. (25 November 1988 – 29 May 1999)
Elio Alevi Pérez Tapia, S.D.B. (19 April 2001 – 25 June 2005)
José María Ortega Trinidad (22 April 2006 – 15 Nov 2018)
Ciro Quispe López (15 Nov 2018–present )

References
 GCatholic.org
 Catholic Hierarchy
 Maryknoll Mission Archives

Roman Catholic dioceses in Peru
Roman Catholic Ecclesiastical Province of Arequipa
Christian organizations established in 1957
Roman Catholic dioceses and prelatures established in the 20th century
Territorial prelatures